Stephen Francis Jansen (born 4 November 1967) is a Canadian former soccer player who earned 8 caps for the Canadian national side between 1988 and 1989. Born in Toronto, Ontario, Jansen played club football for North York Rockets and Toronto Blizzard.
His sister is figure skater Astrid Jansen.

References

1967 births
Living people
Canada men's international soccer players
Canadian soccer players
Association football defenders
Soccer players from Toronto
North York Rockets players
Toronto Blizzard (1986–1993) players
Canadian Soccer League (1987–1992) players